William Frederic Sayer KC (3 December 1857 – 26 February 1943) was an Australian lawyer and politician who was a member of the Legislative Assembly of Western Australia from 1901 to 1902. He was attorney-general in the short-lived government of George Throssell.

Sayer was born in London, and attended the University College School before going on to study law. He came to Western Australia in 1890 to work as a legal adviser to the Midland Railway Company. He later worked for the colonial government, serving as a secretary in the Law Department and then as Commissioner of Titles from 1898 to 1901 (a position in the Department of Lands and Surveys). In March 1901, despite not being a member of parliament, Sayer was appointed attorney-general in the ministry of George Throssell (succeeding Richard Pennefather).

At the 1901 state election, a month after being elevated to the ministry, Sayer won the newly created seat of Claremont. However, at the same election, Throssell's government lost its majority, eventually leading to its demise in May 1901. Sayer was replaced as attorney-general by the new premier, George Leake. He remained in parliament for only another year, resigning in May 1902 to accept the position of chief parliamentary draughtsman. In December 1902, Sayer was appointed crown solicitor (equivalent to Solicitor-General) in succession to Robert Bruce Burnside, a position which he held until his retirement in 1930. He died in February 1943, aged 85.

References

1857 births
1943 deaths
Australian King's Counsel
Australian solicitors
English emigrants to Australia
Members of the Western Australian Legislative Assembly
People educated at University College School
Politicians from London
Lawyers from London
Public servants of Western Australia
Attorneys-General of Western Australia
Solicitors-General of Western Australia